What's Mine Is Yours is the first installment in The Emo Diaries series of compilation albums, released September 16, 1997 by Deep Elm Records. The series title was originally going to be The Indie Rock Diaries, but this was ruled out when Jimmy Eat World and Samiam, who were both signed to major record labels, were selected for the album. The Emo Diaries was chosen because The Emotional Diaries was too long to fit on the album cover. As with future installments, the label had an open submissions policy for bands to submit material for the compilation, and as a result the music does not all fit within the emo style. As with the rest of the series, What's Mine Is Yours features mostly unsigned bands contributing songs that were previously unreleased.

Track listing

References

External links 
 What's Mine Is Yours at Deep Elm Records.

1997 compilation albums
Emo compilation albums
Indie rock compilation albums
Deep Elm Records compilation albums